Henley College Coventry was a further education college in the city of Coventry, England. Established in 1964, it was one of three further education colleges within the city boundaries, alongside City College Coventry and Hereward College before its merger in 2017 with City College to become Coventry College. The campus is located to the north of Coventry city centre and is close to the M6 motorway in a sub area of Bell Green. Graduation ceremonies are held at Coventry Cathedral.

History

2012 expansion
After plans to extensively renovate the college failed in 2009 due to lack of funding, the college was given permission to begin a £6million revamp and expansion in October 2012, replacing the college's original 1960s structures with more modern facilities.

Courses
The college takes on about 6,000 students per year and have both FE and HE courses which include: Applied, Medical, and Forensic Science, Beauty Therapy, Business and Professional Studies, Criminology, Chidldcare and Education, Computing, Games Design, Engineering, Hairdressing, Health and Social Care, Sports and Exercise Sciences, and Travel and Tourism.

Notable alumni
Notable alumni include:
Aimee Challenor – British politician and transgender activist
Marlon Devonish MBE – 100 metre and 200 metre sprint athlete
Colleen Fletcher – Member of Parliament
Chris Kirkland – footballer
Darius Vassell – footballer
Adam Whitehead – swimmer

References

External links
 

Education in Coventry
Further education colleges in the West Midlands (county)
Educational institutions established in 1964
1964 establishments in England